The 1898 Dartmouth football team represented Dartmouth College in the 1898 college football season.

Despite finishing with a losing record, the 1898 Dartmouth team was regarded by some eastern sportswriters, most notably Outing, to be the best fielded by head coach William Wurtenburg. Against an expanded schedule, the squad went only 5–6, but managed to outscore their opponents by a total of 205–137. The year began with a defeat of regular opponent Phillips Exeter Academy, and was followed by a shutout loss to Harvard. After two consecutive wins over nearby schools, Dartmouth lost to former Triangular Football League opponent , 23–5. The latter game was regarded as Dartmouth's most significant game of the season by eastern sportswriters, since Williams had hired two new coaches and expanded practices in order to win the conference in 1898. Dartmouth outdid Williams, however, and defeated them 10–6 to claim a sixth straight conference championship. The season ended on a sour note with four straight losses on the road, two of them coming against Midwestern teams.

Schedule

References

Dartmouth
Dartmouth Big Green football seasons
Dartmouth football